Global Dental Relief volunteers have been working since 2001 to bring dental care to children overseas. GDR works in six countries— Nepal, India, Guatemala, Mexico, Kenya, and Cambodia. GDR previously provided free dental care in Vietnam as well. Since 2001, 2,969 dedicated volunteers served over 193,000 children with $40.1 million in donated dental care in these six countries.

GDR's mission is to engage diverse groups of dental professionals and non-dental volunteers to bring free dental care to children in need throughout the world. Currently GDR has 21 options in six countries to volunteer in a five or six-day clinic providing preventive care and oral health education to impoverished children.

History
Global Dental Relief (GDR) was founded in 2001 as the Himalayan Dental Relief Project by former Director of Colorado State Parks, Laurie Mathews and Andrew Holecek, DDS. While on sabbatical in Nepal, they recognized the desperate need for dental care in a country which, at the time, had 120 dentists for a population approaching 24 million. What started with a single makeshift clinic, serving children in the outskirts of Kathmandu, Nepal, has branched out to the mountains of India, the Guatemalan Highlands, Chogoria, Kenya, the Yucatan peninsula of Mexico and the Angkor region of northwest Cambodia.

Recent Updates

2019 Highlights
In 2019, 21,914 children visited GDR clinics in five countries, receiving $4.5 million in donated dental care from GDR volunteers. These children light up our clinic with their eager smiles as they learn the basic skills of toothbrushing and overall oral health.

This year 27 GDR volunteer teams delivered care to children in five country locations. Clinics are set up in a classroom in just three to four hours, anywhere in the world. Each clinic is staffed by volunteer dentists, hygienists and general volunteers who provide critical care to children.

References 

Organizations based in Denver
Non-profit organizations based in Colorado